Paul Anthony Sorvino (April 13, 1939 – July 25, 2022) was an American actor. He often portrayed authority figures on both the criminal and the law enforcement sides of the law.

Sorvino was particularly known for his roles as Lucchese crime family caporegime Paulie Cicero (based on real life gangster Paul Vario) in Martin Scorsese's 1990 gangster film Goodfellas and as NYPD Sergeant Phil Cerreta on the second and third seasons of the TV series Law & Order. He also played a variety of father figures, including Juliet's father in Baz Luhrmann's 1996 film Romeo + Juliet, as well as guest appearances as the father of Bruce Willis' character on the TV series Moonlighting and the father of Jeff Garlin's character on The Goldbergs. He was in additional supporting roles in A Touch of Class (1973), Reds (1981), The Rocketeer (1991), Nixon (1995, as Henry Kissinger), and The Cooler (2003). 

Usually cast in dramatic supporting roles, he occasionally acted in lead roles in films including Bloodbrothers (1978), and also in comedic roles including his turn as a bombastic Southern evangelist in Carl Reiner's Oh, God! (1977). Sorvino was nominated for a Tony Award for Best Actor for the 1972 play That Championship Season, and later starred in film and television adaptations. He was the father of actors Mira Sorvino and Michael Sorvino.

Early life
Sorvino was born on April 13, 1939, and raised in the Bensonhurst section of Brooklyn. His mother, Angela Maria Mattea (née Renzi; 1906–1991), was a homemaker and piano teacher of Italian (Molisan) descent who was born in Connecticut. His father, Ford Sorvino, was an Italian (Neapolitan) immigrant who worked in a robe factory as a foreman.

Sorvino attended Lafayette High School (where he was a classmate of Peter Max, a painter and artist), graduated, and then went to the American Musical and Dramatic Academy.

Career
Sorvino began his career as a copywriter in an advertising agency. He took voice lessons for 18 years. While attending The American Musical and Dramatic Academy, he decided to go into the theatre. He made his Broadway debut in the 1964 musical Bajour, and six years later he appeared in his first film, Carl Reiner's Where's Poppa?, starring George Segal and Ruth Gordon. In 1971, he played a supporting role in Jerry Schatzberg's critically acclaimed The Panic in Needle Park, starring Al Pacino and Kitty Winn.

Sorvino received critical praise for his performance as Phil Romano in Jason Miller's 1972 Broadway play That Championship Season, a role he reprised in the 1982 film version. He acted in another George Segal-starring film with a prominent supporting role in the Academy Award-winning romantic comedy A Touch of Class (1973). In It Couldn't Happen to a Nicer Guy (1974), he played Harry Walters, a real estate salesman randomly picked up by a beautiful woman (JoAnna Cameron) and raped at gunpoint as a prank. He appeared in the 1976 Elliott Gould/Diane Keaton vehicle I Will, I Will... for Now. He starred in the weekly series We'll Get By (1975, as George Platt), Bert D'Angelo/Superstar (1976, in the title role), and The Oldest Rookie (1987, as Detective Ike Porter). He also directed Wheelbarrow Closers, a 1976 Broadway play by Louis La Russo II, which starred Danny Aiello.

In 1981, Sorvino played the role of Italian-American communist Louis C. Fraina in Warren Beatty's film Reds. He appeared in Larry Cohen's 1985 horror film The Stuff as a reclusive militia leader, alongside future Law & Order co-star Michael Moriarty. Sorvino also helped found the American Stage Company, a group that launched several successful Off-Broadway shows, in 1986.

In 1991, Sorvino took on the role of Sergeant Phil Cerreta (replacing actor George Dzundza in a new role) on the popular series Law & Order. Sorvino initially was excited about the role but left after 29 episodes, citing the exhausting schedule demanded by the filming of the show, a need to broaden his horizons, and the desire to preserve his vocal cords for singing opera. Sorvino's exit from the series came in an episode in which Sgt. Cerreta is shot in the line of duty and transferred to an administrative position in another precinct.

In 1993, Sorvino substituted for Raymond Burr in a Perry Mason TV movie, The Case of the Wicked Wives. He had earlier appeared as Bruce Willis' father in the weekly series Moonlighting and the "Lamont" counterpart in the never-aired original pilot for Sanford and Son. Some of his most notable film roles were caporegime Paul Cicero in Martin Scorsese's Goodfellas (1990) and Henry Kissinger in Oliver Stone's Nixon (1995). In addition to Goodfellas, Sorvino also played mob bosses Eddie Valentine in The Rocketeer and Tony Morolto in The Firm.

Sorvino founded the Paul Sorvino Asthma Foundation; he intended to build asthma centers for children and adults across the United States. In 1998, he narrated the series The Big House for The History Channel. In 1999, he directed and again starred in (albeit playing a different role) a TV version of That Championship Season.

In Hey Arnold!: The Movie, Sorvino voiced the main antagonist, Mr. Scheck, the CEO of Future Tech Industries, who wants to convert Arnold's neighborhood into a huge shopping mall. From 2000 to 2002, Sorvino had a lead role as Frank DeLucca in the television drama That's Life. He also starred in the comedy Still Standing as Al Miller, father to Bill (Mark Addy). Sorvino filmed The Trouble with Cali in the Scranton/Wilkes-Barre area of Pennsylvania. He directed and starred in the film, and his daughter Mira also acted in a lead role in the film.

Sorvino played GeneCo founder Rotti Largo in the 2008 musical film Repo! The Genetic Opera. Working with Repo! director Darren Lynn Bousman again, Sorvino played God in The Devil's Carnival, a short film screened on tour beginning in April 2012.

Sorvino's final motion picture The Ride will be released posthumously in 2022. Sorvino appeared alongside Dean Cain, D.B. Sweeney, and his wife Dee Dee Sorvino for his final performance. Sorvino's scenes were filmed in Jacksonville, Florida.

Personal life
Sorvino lived in Los Angeles and Madison, Indiana. He had three children: Mira, Michael, and Amanda from his first marriage with Lorraine Davis. Mira and Michael are actors.

On January 17, 2007, news reports detailed that he pulled a gun in front of Daniel Snee, an ex-boyfriend of his daughter Amanda, after the man pounded on her hotel room door and made threats. Amanda testified that Snee threatened to kill her at a hotel on January 3 in Stowe, Vermont. She said she locked herself in the bathroom and called both the police and her father. Her 67-year-old father showed up before police, she testified. When police arrived, the young man was arrested and charged with disorderly conduct, she said. As a deputy sheriff in Pennsylvania, Sorvino was legally authorized to carry a gun in different states. He did not point the gun at Snee or threaten him.

In March 2008, Sorvino and his daughter Amanda lobbied with the Americans Against Horse Slaughter in Washington D.C., for U.S. Congress to pass the American Horse Slaughter Prevention Act (S311/HR503). The Sorvinos run a private horse rescue operation in Gilbert, Pennsylvania.

Sorvino was also an accomplished sculptor, specializing in cast bronze. In December 2008 his sculpture of the late playwright Jason Miller was unveiled in Scranton, Pennsylvania. In addition, he guest-starred on the 2008 album of Neapolitan singer Eddy Napoli, Napulitanata, performing a duet of the song "Luna Rossa".

In 2007, Sorvino launched Paul Sorvino Foods to market a range of pasta sauces. Based on his mother's recipe, the product appeared in supermarkets in the northeastern United States in late 2009. Three years later, Sorvino became part owner in Janson-Beckett Cosmeceuticals.

In an April 2014 interview, Sorvino said, "Most people think I'm either a gangster or a cop or something, but the reality is I'm a sculptor, a painter, a best-selling author, many, many things—a poet, an opera singer, but none of them is gangster, but, you know, obviously I sort of have a knack for playing these things. It's almost my later goal in life to disabuse people of the notion that I'm a slow-moving, heavy-lidded thug, and most people's impression of me IS that—because of the success of Goodfellas and a few other things, but they forget that I was also Dr. Kissinger in Nixon, the deaf lawyer in Dummy, and they forget a lot of things that I've done. It would be nice to have my legacy more than that of just tough guy."

Before screening his film Once Upon a Time in Queens at the Florida Film Festival in Orlando in April 2014, Sorvino revealed that he practiced New Formalism, by writing rhymed and metrical verse after the heyday of Modernist poetry, and recited one of his own poems as an example.

In December 2014, Sorvino married political pundit Dee Dee Benkie after he met her while appearing as a guest on Your World With Neil Cavuto.

In January 2018, Sorvino found out that Harvey Weinstein allegedly sexually harassed his daughter Mira, and blacklisted her within the film industry after she rejected the film mogul's sexual demands. In response, Sorvino told TMZ, "He's going to go to jail. Oh yeah. That son of a bitch. Good for him if he goes, because if not, he has to meet me. And I will kill the motherfucker. Real simple. If I had known it, he would not be walking. He'd be in a wheelchair. This pig will get his comeuppance. The law will get him. He's going to go to jail and die in jail."

Death
Sorvino died at Mayo Clinic Florida in Jacksonville on July 25, 2022, aged 83. He was interred at Hollywood Forever Cemetery.

Filmography

Film

Television

References

External links 

 
 
 

1939 births
2022 deaths
American male film actors
American male television actors
American male voice actors
20th-century American male actors
21st-century American male actors
Male actors from New York City
American Musical and Dramatic Academy alumni
20th-century American male opera singers
21st-century American male opera singers
American poets of Italian descent
Artists from Brooklyn
American writers of Italian descent
Formalist poets
Poets from California
Poets from New Jersey
Poets from New York (state)
Writers from Brooklyn
Lafayette High School (New York City) alumni
American people of Italian descent
People of Molisan descent
People from Bensonhurst, Brooklyn
People from Teaneck, New Jersey
People from Tenafly, New Jersey
Burials at Hollywood Forever Cemetery